RaInCube, also stylized as RainCube, was a 6U CubeSat made by NASA as an experimental satellite. It had a small radar and an antenna. It was put into orbit in May 2018 and was deployed from the International Space Station on June 25, 2018. It re-entered Earth's atmosphere and burned up on Dec. 24, 2020.  It was used to track large storms.

Mission objectives 
RainCube's mission objectives were to:

 Demonstrate low-cost Ka band radar technology, with a vertical resolution of 250m and a horizontal resolution of at least 10 km. Its radar sensitivity should also be better than 20dBZ.
 Use Ka-band radar from a 6U CubeSat
 Profiling precipitation falling on Earth

Launch and deployment 

RaInCube was launched as part of the Cygnus OA-9E Commercial Resupply Services mission on board an Antares 230 rocket on May 21, 2018, at Wallops Pad 0A. The Cygnus spacecraft docked with the International Space Station on May 24, 2018, three days later. RaInCube was finally deployed from the International Space Station on July 13, 2018.

Gallery

References

External links 

Satellites deployed from the International Space Station
CubeSats
2018 in spaceflight
Spacecraft launched in 2018
Spacecraft which reentered in 2020
Technology demonstration satellites
NASA satellites
Satellites of the United States